Klaas Lodewyck (born 24 March 1988) is a Belgian former professional road cyclist, who rode professionally between 2009 and 2015 for the ,  and  squads. He now works as a directeur sportif for UCI WorldTeam .

Major results

2005
 2nd Paris–Roubaix Juniors
2006
 9th Paris–Roubaix Juniors
2007
 1st Stage 2 Ronde de l'Oise
 2nd Road race, National Under-23 Road Championships
 10th Grand Prix de Waregem
2008
 3rd Omloop van het Waasland
2009
 9th Châteauroux Classic
 9th Grand Prix de Fourmies
 10th Omloop van het Waasland
2010
 3rd Cholet-Pays de Loire
 4th Omloop van het Waasland
 4th Paris–Tours
 5th Nokere Koerse
 5th Profronde van Fryslan
 8th Antwerpse Havenpijl
2011
 4th Trofeo Cala Millor
 5th Trofeo Mallorca
 8th Trofeo Magaluf
 10th Overall Driedaagse van West-Vlaanderen
2012
 1st  Combativity classification Tour of Oman
 9th Halle–Ingooigem
2014
 5th Handzame Classic
 7th Nokere Koerse
2015
 6th Handzame Classic

Grand Tour general classification results timeline

References

External links

1988 births
Living people
Belgian male cyclists
People from Roeselare
Cyclists from West Flanders